William Francis Bell (August 8, 1918 – September 20, 1984) was a golf course architect, active from the 1960s into the early 1980s.

Biography
Born in Pasadena, California, son of noted architect Billy Bell, Bell Jr. studied at University of Southern California in Los Angeles.  He was affectionately known as "Billy Bell Jr.".

William F. Bell's courses were designed in the Western United States.  Bell is considered a commercial golf course architect with more than 200 courses credited to his work and design, mostly in the American West and Hawaii.  Notably, Bell was the golf architect for Torrey Pines Golf Course, both Torrey Pines North course and Torrey Pines South course, site of the 2008 and 2020 US Open.

Bell was elected into The American Society of Golf Course Architects (ASGCA) in 1950 and served as ASGCA President from 1957-1958.  Bell was elected in 2017 to the Southern California Golf Association Hall of Fame for his contribution to the sport of golf.

Bell's Mesa Verde Country Club hosted the PGA Tour Orange County Open Invitational from 1959 - 1962 with notable champions Tony Lema and Billy Casper.  LPGA Nancy Lopez won at Mesa Verde Country Club in 1984. 

Bell's Bermuda Dunes Country Club hosted the PGA Tour's Desert Classic for 49 years. 

Bell's Newport Beach Country Club course has hosted the Hoag Classic on the PGA Tour Champions from 1995 - 2022. 

Bell's Saticoy Club hosted the LPGA Mediheal Championship in October 2022. 

Following at $25 renovation upgrade, Bell's Industry Hills is home to the Southern California Section of the PGA of America since 2016.  
Industry Hills Eisenhower course has hosted several professional tournaments:
LPGA 1980 Olympia Gold Classic 
LPGA 2011 Kia Classic.  
2011 U.S. Women's Open Qualifying.
2016 U.S. Women's Open Qualifying.

Notable courses
Alhambra Municipal Golf Course
 Ancil Hoffman, Sacramento, CA
 Apple Valley Country Club, Apple Valley, CA
 Bakersfield Country Club (Private), Bakersfield, CA (with William P. Bell)
 Bermuda Dunes Country Club, Bermuda Dunes, CA
 California Country Club, Whittier, CA
 Canyon at Mountain Dell Golf Course, Salt Lake City, UT
 Eaton Canyon, CA
 Hawaii Kai Golf Course, Honolulu, HI
 Heartwell Golf Course, Long Beach, CA
 Idaho Falls Country Club, Idaho Falls, ID
 Industry Hills Eisenhower, City of Industry, CA
 Industry Hills Zaharias, City of Industry, CA
 Los Verdes Golf Course, Rancho Palos Verdes, CA
 Lomas Santa Fe, Solana Beach, CA
 Maryvale Golf Course, Phoenix, AZ
 Mesa Verde Country Club, Costa Mesa, CA
 Mission Trails Golf Course, San Diego, CA
 Newport Beach Country Club, Newport Beach, CA
 Palo Alto Municipal Golf Course, Palo Alto, CA
 Papago Golf Course, Phoenix
 Peacock Gap Country Club, San Rafael, CA
 Recreation Park, Long Beach, CA
 Rancho Bernando Inn, San Diego, CA
 Sandpiper Golf Course, Santa Barbara, CA
 Saticoy Club, Somis, CA
 Tamarisk Country Club, Rancho Mirage, CA
 Torrey Pines Golf Course, San Diego, CA
 Tucson Country Club, Tucson, AZ (with William P. Bell)

References

 

1918 births
1984 deaths
Sportspeople from Los Angeles
Golf course architects
Architects from Pasadena, California